Marcelo Filippini was the defending champion, but lost in the second round to Nicklas Kulti.

Paolo Canè won the title by defeating Bruno Orešar 7–6(7–4), 7–6(7–5) in the final.

Seeds

Draw

Finals

Top half

Bottom half

References

External links
 Official results archive (ATP)
 Official results archive (ITF)

Men's Singles
Singles